Cartagena del Chairá is a town and municipality in the Colombian Department of Caquetá. The town gained notoriety during the failed FARC-Government peace process (1999-2002) between the Government of Colombia and the guerrilla group Revolutionary Armed Forces of Colombia (FARC) which still maintains operations and a high influence in the area despite the presence of the Colombian Military.

External links
 Government of Caquetá official website
 Government of Cartagena del Chairá official website

References

Municipalities of Caquetá Department